Sudsy Monchik (born October 12, 1974),  is an American racquetball player.   As a five-time Pro World Champion, Monchik is one of the top 3 players in the history of the sport. Monchik was known for his power and speed, as well as his shot-making ability, especially his backhand, which many   believe is the best in the game.  Sudsy revolutionized the sport with his electric personality combined with his tremendous shot power from both his backhand and forehand along with his jaw dropping shot making ability. Sudsy only competed professionally for 7 seasons. Due to a back condition and broken foot which needed surgery, he had to retire early. There are many that believe if he had been healthy he would have shattered all the records. Sudsy only played 7 healthy seasons on the professional tour and finished the season as the #1 player in the world an astonishing 5 times. Sudsy is the true ambassador to Racquetball worldwide. Sudsy made another outstanding comeback with a win in the 2018 USA Racquetball National Doubles Championships with partner Rocky Carson. Sudsy will now represent Team USA in San Jose, Costa Rica for the World Championships in August 2018. Sudsy's wife, Veronica Sotomayor is the most decorated racquetball player in the history of her home country of Ecuador.

Professional career
Monchik won the US Open, racquetball's most prestigious event,  in its first year 1996, and then again three more times, in 1998, 2000, and 2002. He and Kane Waselenchuk are the only two men to win the US Open more than twice.

Monchik's 50+ tournament wins places him fourth in career tournament wins behind only Cliff Swain (70), Kane Waselenchuk (111), and Marty Hogan (60). He compiled those wins in 137 tournament appearances, 13th all time.

Monchik won at least one pro tournament in each of his first 8 seasons competing on the pro tour from 1993-94 to 2000-01. However, after failing to win for a second season, Monchik retired from the  International Racquetball Tour (IRT) after the 2003-04 season. He came back in the 2006-07 season, playing 9 of 13 events, but only reached the semi-finals once, and retired again.

Sudsy continues to stay involved as a commentator and advisor to the top organizations and governing bodies in the sport. Sudsy made an amazing return to the professional tour in October 2017 with a quarter final finish at the United Healthcare US OPEN which he previously won 4 times.

In January 2021, Sudsy with his partner Alex Landa won the Men’s Professional Doubles in Atlanta, GA.

International career
Prior to turning pro, Monchik won three consecutive World Junior titles in Boy's 18 and under from 1991–1993, as well as doubles titles in Boys 18 & under with James Mulcock in 1993 and Jason Mannino in 1992.

Monchik represented the USA in the 1995 Pan American Games in Argentina, where he played doubles with Tim Sweeney, winning the gold medal by defeating Canadians Chris Brumwell and Jacques Demers in the final.

Sudsy is the only player in the history of the sport to win every age division at the Junior Nationals in both singles and doubles. All doubles titles with Jason Mannino.
In February 2018 Sudsy made another amazing return to racquetball. He and his partner Rocky Carson won the USA National Doubles Championships. At age 43, Sudsy has once again qualified to play on Team USA and compete in the World Championships in August 2018 in South America.
In February 2020 Sudsy once again amazed the sport by winning the USA National Doubles with partner Alex Landa and qualified for Team USA for the 2020-2021 year.

Post-playing career
In 2006, Monchik was forced into retirement due to a back injury diagnosed as spondylolisthesis. Monchik was selected for induction into the USA Racquetball Hall of Fame in 2015. Previously, he was selected as an inductee into the 2008-2009 Staten Island Sports Hall of Fame.

In 2013, Monchik began an association with Dunlop Racquetball. Dunlop and Sudsy ended their relationship in 2015 when Dunlop decided to leave the racquetball category. Sudsy also was a commentator for that year's US Open Racquetball Championships, which were broadcast on Tennis Channel.
To date, Sudsy has led the youth and senior Ecuador national teams' to the best results in the country's international competition history. Events coached, Pan American Games, Toronto Canada in July 2015, Junior World Championships, Santo Domingo Dominican Republic 2015, Pan American Championships, San Luis Potosí Mexico in 2016, World Championships in Cali Colombia 2016, Junior World Championships 2016 in San Luis Potosí Mexico, San Jose José Costa Rica 2017 Pan Am Championships. Sudsy resigned as Head Coach of Ecuador in July 2017 due to personal reasons. Sudsy continues to coach and advise players of all levels worldwide.
Some notable players include: Gaby Martinez-GUA, Conrado Moscoso-BOL, Jose Ubilla-CR, Mari Cruz Ortiz-CR

See also
 List of racquetball players

References

External links
 International Racquetball Tour (IRT)

1974 births
Living people
American racquetball players
Sportspeople from Staten Island
Pan American Games gold medalists for the United States
Pan American Games medalists in racquetball
Racquetball players at the 1995 Pan American Games
Medalists at the 1995 Pan American Games